Brock Creek is a stream in Washington County in the U.S. state of Missouri. It is a tributary of the Big River.

Brock Creek has the name of one Mr. Brock, an early settler.

See also
List of rivers of Missouri

References

Rivers of Washington County, Missouri
Rivers of Missouri